Pleuropetalum darwinii is a species of plant in the family Amaranthaceae. It is native to the Galápagos Islands.

References

Amaranthaceae
Flora of the Galápagos Islands
Vulnerable plants
Taxonomy articles created by Polbot